Crescent Convent School in Dildarnagar, Uttar Pradesh, India, is a co-ed school founded by Md. Riyaz Ahamed Khan. It is governed by a registered academic and social institution. It was started in 1990 in an old building. The school is affiliated to Central Board of Secondary Education, New Delhi since 2008. It is a co-educational school for children from standard nursery to XII.

References

External links

High schools and secondary schools in Uttar Pradesh
Education in Ghazipur district
Dildarnagar
Educational institutions established in 1990
1990 establishments in Uttar Pradesh